Olaf Sigvart Hovdenak (October 6, 1891 – September 12, 1929) was a Norwegian long-distance runner. He represented SK Freidig in Trondheim.

At the 1912 Summer Olympics he participated in the individual cross country competition and finished nineteenth. Together with his teammates Parelius Finnerud and Johannes Andersen he finished fourth in the team cross country competition. He became Norwegian champion in the 5000 metres in 1913 and 1916 and in the 10,000 metres the same years.

References

1891 births
1929 deaths
Norwegian male long-distance runners
Athletes (track and field) at the 1912 Summer Olympics
Olympic athletes of Norway
Olympic cross country runners